Errol T. Louis (born August 24, 1962) is a New York City journalist, and television show host. He has unsuccessfully run for office several times.

Early life, education, and early career

Louis was born in Harlem and raised in New Rochelle, New York, by his father, Edward J. Louis, a retired New York City police officer, and his mother, Tomi (Hawkins) Louis, a bookkeeper. He received a B.A. in government from Harvard, an M.A. in political science from Yale, and a J.D. from Brooklyn Law School.

Louis co-founded the Central Brooklyn Federal Credit Union with Mark Winston Griffith in the spring of 1993. The two were known as "the hip-hop bankers".

Before going into journalism, Louis taught urban studies at Pratt Institute.

Politics

On September 9, 1997, Louis ran in the Democratic primary for New York City Council District 35 against incumbent Mary Pinkett and police officer James E. Davis. Louis had charged Pinkett with being absent in the community, and he was endorsed by Congressman Major Owens, State Senator Velmanette Montgomery, and Assemblyman Roger L. Green.

Louis lost to Pinkett with 27.82% of the vote, but then ran against Pinkett again in the November 4, 1997, general election on the Green Party line, with Davis on the Conservative Party and Liberal Party lines. Louis was defeated with 8.54% of the vote.

Louis declared his candidacy in the 2001 Democratic primary for the same City Council seat, but he had dropped out of the race by August 2001.

Journalism

Formerly an associate editor of The New York Sun, Louis joined the New York Daily News in 2004 and for many years wrote a column, "Commerce and Community", for Our Time Press, which is published weekly and based in the Bedford-Stuyvesant neighborhood of Brooklyn. Louis also served on the editorial board.

On June 23, 2008, Louis became host of the Morning Show, a three-hour talk program on radio station WWRL; in 2009 he was succeeded by Mark Riley. In November 2010 The Village Voice named him the city's best newspaper columnist and radio show host.

Louis joined NY1 in November 2010 as political anchor and the host of Inside City Hall, a program about New York City politics that airs nightly. He is the Director of the Urban Reporting program at the City University of New York's Graduate School of Journalism. He is also a CNN contributor and has made frequent appearances on Lou Dobbs Tonight and other CNN news programs.

Louis was once named by New York Magazine as one of "10 New Yorkers Making a Difference", "with energy, vision and independent thinking."

Personal life

Louis lives in Crown Heights, Brooklyn, with his wife, Juanita Scarlett, and their son, Noah Louis.

Electoral history

Notes

External links
Inside City Hall website

1962 births
Living people
American newspaper editors
People from Harlem
Brooklyn Law School alumni
Harvard University alumni
New York (state) Democrats
Politicians from Manhattan
Politicians from New York City
Yale University alumni
Television personalities from New Rochelle, New York
Journalists from New York (state)
20th-century American journalists
American male journalists
20th-century American politicians
Charles H. Revson Foundation